San Juan Hills High School is a high school located in San Juan Capistrano, California, and it is the sixth high school of the Capistrano Unified School District. The school officially opened in the 2007–2008 school year as a new comprehensive high school and it serves the residents of San Juan Capistrano, Talega of San Clemente, Capistrano Beach, and southern Ladera Ranch in Orange County, California.

Arts and athletics
 
San Juan Hills has: an art program, volleyball, baseball, pep squad, basketball, football, golf, lacrosse, soccer, tennis, water polo, softball, cross country, surfing, swimming, wrestling and track & field teams.

References

High schools in Orange County, California
Public high schools in California
2007 establishments in California
Educational institutions established in 2007